The Chatham Jail was an adult prison located at 17 7th Ave at the corner of Stanley Ave in Chatham, Ontario. The jail closed May 16, 2014. The Chatham Jail along with the Windsor Jail were replaced by the South West Detention Centre in Maidstone (Windsor) Ontario.

History
The building, together with the Kent County Courthouse, was designed by Canadian architect William Thomas. The Neoclassical limestone building was completed in 1850, and features a balustraded balcony, a prominent pediment and a crowning cupola. While it was being built, the future Canadian Prime Minister Alexander Mackenzie worked on its construction as a stone mason. The court is no longer in use.

See also 
List of correctional facilities in Ontario

References

Buildings and structures in Chatham-Kent
Defunct prisons in Ontario
1850 establishments in Canada
2014 disestablishments in Ontario
Neoclassical architecture in Canada